Lansdown, also known as the Charles Stewart Plantation, is a historic house located on Hamden Road along the South Branch Raritan River in the village of Lansdowne, northeast of Pittstown, in Franklin Township, Hunterdon County, New Jersey. It was added to the National Register of Historic Places on November 2, 1979, for its significance in architecture, military, and politics/government.

The oldest part of the house was probably built , when the land was deeded to Charles Stewart by his father-in-law, Justice Samuel Johnston. George Washington and his wife often visited this house.

References

External links 
 
 
 

Franklin Township, Hunterdon County, New Jersey
National Register of Historic Places in Hunterdon County, New Jersey
Houses on the National Register of Historic Places in New Jersey
New Jersey Register of Historic Places
Houses in Hunterdon County, New Jersey